Cooling unit may refer to:

 Air conditioner
 Chiller
 Evaporative cooler
 Fan (machine)
 Refrigerator